Khatan-Bator is a two-part Mongolian language biopic film based on the life of Khatanbaatar Magsarjav. Khatanbaatar was a  Mongolian General who overthrew the Manchurian Forces in Mongolia led by the Amban Chinese occupation of Urga. The film was directed by Jigjidsuren Gombojav and produced by Mongol Kino. It was submitted to the 12th Moscow International Film Festival.

Synopsis
Story is based in the life of Khatanbaatar Magsarjav, a Mongolian general and a leading figure in Mongolia's struggle for independence. His contingent of 800 elite Mongol soldiers fought White Russian and Chinese forces over 30 times between 1912 and 1921, without a single defeat. He served as acting prime minister from February 15, 1921 to March 13, 1921, under Roman Ungern von Sternberg's puppet regime and later fought the baron forces.

Cast and Staffs

 Director: G.Jigjidsuren
 Photographer: L. Sharavdorj, G.Tseren
 Author: S.Udval, G.Jigjidsuren
 Composer: Z.Hangal
 Songwriter: B.Sambuu
 Screenplay: D.Badamtseren
 Writers: D.Tumenbayar, D.Didid, T.Narantsetseg

Cast
 E. Erdenebulgan as Khatanbaatar Magsarjav
 R. Lorzambat as Damdin Sukhbaatar
 L. Nerendamba as Manlaibaatar Damdinsuren (part-1)
 R. Dorjbat as Sukhbaatar 
 Anatoly Tkalcher as Baron Ungern 
 Demberen Sedor - Grigory Semyonov
 S.Anatoli- Bakerk
 A. Ochirbat as Togmind  
Cameo roles
(Part - I and II )
 D. Altangeren as Toogoo
 N. Chegmed  as the Bogd Khan
 Nikoliai Magnikov as Eshetenkihn
 Boris Andrev as Andriei V.Burdokov
 P. Jamsranjav as Amban San-dowa (A Chinese official)
 A. Avirmed as Darbzab
 D. Chimed-Osor as Ovgon
 S. Renden as G. Soyn 
 S. Seded as Dermeen
 R. Eldorj as Capt. Tien Shi Hung (Beiyang Army)
 Z. Jarantav - Beiyang Army
 S. Medndee - Beiyang Army
 S. Dorj  - Beiyang Army
 B. Goboj - Amban's servant 
 Yuri Martinov - Russian commander 
 N. Smorchkov - Russian Soldier 
 Z. Dedendambaa- Buryat Soldier
 Cookie or Altangerel-Dashtseleg
 Mr. Gangen Suwen
 Bogd Jebtsundamba Khutuktu - The Tsegmah of Najat
 Jargal -  Nysing
 Daruz - Choir 
 D.Davaajav - Gunjchinhorloo

References

External links

Films set in Mongolia
1980s biographical films
Mongolian drama films